Jastrzębia Góra (or Jastrzãbiô Góra) is a village on the south coast of the Baltic Sea in the Kashubia, in the administrative district of Gmina Władysławowo, within Puck County, Pomeranian Voivodeship, in northern Poland. Prior to January 1, 2015, it was a part of the town Władysławowo.
Jastrzębia Góra is the northernmost inhabited village of Poland.

For details of the history of the region, see History of Pomerania.

The village has a population of 1068.

Gallery

References

Villages in Puck County